Ignatius Teichberg (April 15, 1923 - January 10, 2006) was a stock broker, investment analyst and financial columnist known as Igo ("pronounced 'ego'").

After 27 years of working for others, having made his reputation on "his stock picking prowess," he had a firm with his name
and "Teichberg's Market Strategy, a newsletter that specializes in scouting takeover targets."

Career
Having been an employee during a 27-year period at four brokerage firms, he acquired a small firm which he renamed Teichberg, Loeb, Waxman & Rabinowitz. His employers included
 Edward Viner & Co. (vice president)
 D. H. Blair Company
 Gruntal & Co. (his last employer, at which he was "vice president and director of the institutional" research department)

Columnist
His column at The New York Post, for which circulation "increased by 10% on the day it appeared," gave him publicity that was described by Business Week as "fraught with potential conflict of interest" yet they explained his clean record with "says he doesn't play the market himself" and that most of his brokerage clients "do not own stocks recommended in the Post."

Biography
Born in pre-World War II Poland, his pre-New York path included Romania, and West Berlin. "Teichberg emigrated to New York City in 1952 and five years later became a junior stock analyst." Much later he was quoted as saying that "stock picking is an art, not a science."

He, his son Jonathan Benzion and his wife Charlotte (née Hanft) lived in Forest Hills.

References

External links
 TEICHBERG v. BLAIR & CO. (letter mailed presumed received _VS._ letter not received presumed not mailed). Lawsuit: Teichberg vs. his employer, and both sides appeared to retain pleasant interaction

1923 births
2006 deaths
Polish expatriates in Romania
Polish expatriates in Germany
Polish emigrants to the United States
American stockbrokers